The School of Public Policy is an institute at the University of Calgary located in Calgary, Alberta, Canada. Founded in 2008, The school is devoted to public policy research and education, and is led by Pierre-Gerlier Forest. Located at the University of Calgary’s downtown campus, it is home to over 60 full-time or part-time faculty and fellows. The school is organized into three policy areas: Economic and Social Policy, Energy and Environmental Policy, and International Policy. Since 2012 the school has offered a graduate degree program, the Master of Public Policy. The degree is structured as a 12-month program involving two semesters of classroom-based learning and one semester of project work.

History

Founding 

The School of Public Policy was founded in January 2008 as The School of Policy Studies when economist Jack Mintz left the Rotman School of Management at the University of Toronto to become Palmer Chair in Public Policy at the University of Calgary. The chair was established through a gift of $4 million from James S. Palmer and Barbara A. Palmer intended to create a school for policy studies at the University of Calgary.

From its inception, The School of Public Policy was designed as an interdisciplinary institution that would draw on expertise from academics across various departments and faculties at the university, including the Department of Economics, Department of Political Science, the Centre for Military and Strategic Studies and the University of Calgary Faculty of Law. Among the university’s faculty contributing to early work by The School of Public Policy were Dr. Ron Kneebone, Dr. Herb Emery, Dr. David Bercuson and Dr. Robert Mansell. The school was formally launched on May 13, 2009, at an opening dinner during which former U.S. Secretary of State Condoleezza Rice delivered a keynote speech.

Academics

Research structure 

The School’s research is organized into three policy areas: Economic and Social Policy, Energy and Environmental Policy, and International Policy. Each area consists of underlying programs devoted to more specific policy areas. Research projects are guided and approved by a Research Committee.

The School follows a strict model for academic objectivity.  All research is requested by an independent research committee made up of academics at The School.  Then, research is reviewed by two anonymous peer reviewers.  Research is then edited and subjected to a final objectivity and quality review by an independent academic area director.

Research output 

The school maintains its own peer-reviewed publication series. Papers focus on current public policy issues and are written by both internal and external authors. The publication series includes three different types of papers: Communiqués, Research Papers and Technical Papers. In the 2013 calendar year, the school produced 43 publications. By comparison, it produced 32 in 2012, 20 in 2011 and 17 in 2010.

The school publishes an annual global tax competitiveness ranking that compares the attractiveness to business investment of roughly 90 countries and the 10 Canadian provinces based on their tax regimes. The Marginal Effective Tax Rate (METR) of each jurisdiction is calculated, which then determines the rankings.

Other notable research by the school includes a paper written by Martha Hall Findlay from June 2012, which called for the dismantling of Canada’s supply management regime for dairy and poultry products. A paper published in December 2011 regarding market potential for Canadian energy exports also drew attention from politicians and nationa media] in the context of ongoing debate around pipeline projects, including Keystone XL. The report quantified potential gains for the Canadian and provincial economies if the country was able to match the demands of new emerging markets and argued that this was contingent on pipeline projects being completed.

Degrees 

In September 2011, the school began offering its graduate degree program, the Master of Public Policy (MPP). The MPP is structured as a one-year program with three semesters. The first two semesters involve classroom study whereas in the final semester, students work on a capstone project for a sponsoring organization from the private or public sector. The school admits between 30 and 40 students to the program each year, including international students.

Core courses in the MPP are taught out of the school’s classroom space at the University of Calgary’s Downtown Campus with some elective courses taught at the university’s main campus.
The school offers a joint Master of Business Administration (MBA), Master of Public Policy (MPP) program. This program is run by both the school and the Haskayne School of Business. A joint Juris Doctor, Master of Public Policy program is also offered.

Conservatism
Some commentators have argued that the School functions as a publicly funded conservative lobby group.

Key people

David Bercuson 
Martha Hall Findlay, who is currently president and CEO of the Canada West Foundation,

References 

University of Calgary